Mount Whittier may refer to a mountain in the United States:

Mount Whittier (New Hampshire)
Mount Whittier Ski Area, former ski resort
Mount Whittier (Washington), near Mount St. Helens

See also
Whittier Peak, in the North Cascades of Washington